Dedh galli also spelt Dedh gully is a street market in Mumbai. It means one and a half alley. It has been described as one of Mumbai's three Chor Bazars or flea markets primarily for footwear. It is located in the Kamathipura area of the city, behind Alexander cinema. The market functions between 4 am to 8 am, on Friday and Sunday.

References 

Neighbourhoods in Mumbai